is a former international table tennis player from Japan.

Table tennis career
From 1963 to 1967 she won nine medals in singles, doubles, and team events in the World Table Tennis Championships.

The nine World Championship medals included three gold medals; one in the mixed doubles at the 1967 World Table Tennis Championships with Nobuhiko Hasegawa and two in the team event for Japan.

See also
 List of table tennis players
 List of World Table Tennis Championships medalists

References

Japanese female table tennis players
Asian Games medalists in table tennis
Table tennis players at the 1962 Asian Games
Table tennis players at the 1966 Asian Games
Asian Games gold medalists for Japan
Asian Games silver medalists for Japan
Asian Games bronze medalists for Japan
Medalists at the 1962 Asian Games
Medalists at the 1966 Asian Games